Ovey is a surname. Notable people with the surname include:

Sir Esmond Ovey (1879–1963), British ambassador
George Ovey (1870–1951), American film actor and comedian
Mike Ovey (1958–2017), British Anglican clergyman, academic, and lawyer

See also
Ovie